Emasithandane Children's Project (also known as Emasithandane) is a home for orphaned and other vulnerable children in Nyanga, Cape Town, South Africa, one of the poorest townships in the city. About 25 children live in the home. It was founded by Mama Zelphina Maposela, who moved to Nyanga from the Eastern Cape to help address the orphan crisis in the area. Emasithandane has partnered with organizations such as the Desmond Tutu TB Centre, CHOSA, and People Environmental Planning.

References

External links
 El Día Mundial del Sida
 Jornada Mundial Contra el SIDA
 The Children of South Africa

Children's charities based in South Africa
Orphanages in Africa